"Blues Ain't No Mocking Bird" is a short story by Toni Cade Bambara written in 1971. It is told through the point of view of a young black girl in North America. Blues Ain't No Mockin Bird is about a family whose privacy is invaded by two white cameramen who are making a film for the county's food stamp program. In this story, the little girl is playing with her neighbors, Tyrone and Terry and cousin, Cathy at her grandmother’s house. Her grandmother is on the back porch spreading rum on the cakes she has made. Two white filmmakers, shooting a film ‘‘about food stamps’’ for the county, tree near their yard. The little girl’s grandmother asks them to leave but not listening to her request, they simply move farther away. When Granddaddy Cain returns from hunting a chicken hawk, he takes the camera from the men and smashes it. The white men swear and go away. Cathy, the distant cousin of the little girl, displays a precocious ability to interpret other people’s actions and words as well as an interest in storytelling and writing. Granny shares a story with the children and Cathy which relates to her feeling about people filming without permission. To her, life is not to be publicized to everyone because they are not as "good" or wealthy as others.

The reader may notice the nonstandard spellings of words such as 'mockin' ('mocking') or 'nuthin' ('nothing') as the story is written in a variety of African-American English.

 American short stories
1971 short stories
 Supplemental Nutrition Assistance Program
 African-American short stories
 Short stories by Toni Cade Bambara
 Literature by African-American women